Robert Orville Dille (July 2, 1917 – December 10, 1998) was an American professional basketball player and championship high school coach.  Dille was an All-American forward at Valparaiso, where he was a member of "The World's Tallest Team" and later coached Fort Wayne's Northrop High School to an Indiana state championship in 1974.  He was inducted into the Indiana Basketball Hall of Fame in 1989.

Dille starred at Chesterton High School in Chesterton, Indiana and matriculated at Valparaiso University as a 26-year-old with a wife and son.  He played varsity basketball while working 48 hours a week at a local company in addition to his full courseload.  In 1944, Dille was named Valparaiso's first nationally recognized All-American.

Following his collegiate career, Dille played for the Detroit Falcons of the Basketball Association of America, averaging 5.2 points per game in his lone season with the club.

Dille was an assistant coach for Valparaiso University during the 1947–48 season, and he later coached high school basketball in his home state of Indiana.  He coached at Valparaiso High School, Berne-French Township High School and Fort Wayne North before taking the reins at Fort Wayne Northrop in 1971.  Dille coached at Northrop for seven years, winning a state championship in 1974.

BAA career statistics

Regular season

References

1917 births
1998 deaths
All-American college men's basketball players
American men's basketball players
Basketball players from Fort Wayne, Indiana
Detroit Falcons (basketball) players
Forwards (basketball)
Hammond Ciesar All-Americans players
High school basketball coaches in the United States
People from Chesterton, Indiana
People from Valparaiso, Indiana
Philadelphia Warriors draft picks 
Toronto Huskies draft picks 
Valparaiso Beacons men's basketball players